Levin Minnemann Rudess or LMR is a debut collaboration album from half of Liquid Tension Experiment; bassist Tony Levin (King Crimson, Peter Gabriel, Stick Men) and Dream Theater keyboardist Jordan Rudess with the addition of drummer Marco Minnemann (Steven Wilson, The Aristocrats, Joe Satriani). It was released on September 5, 2013, by Lazy Bones Recordings.

Track listing

Personnel
Jordan Rudess - keyboards, continuum, wizardly sounds, seaboard
Tony Levin - basses, Chapman Stick, cello
Marco Minnemann - drums, guitars

2013 debut albums
Tony Levin albums
Marco Minnemann albums
Jordan Rudess albums